Central Norway is an informal region of Norway that is not clearly defined. The term Central Norway may in its most limited usage refer only to Trøndelag county, but may also be understood to include all or parts of the county of Møre og Romsdal, some parts of Nordland county as well as some municipalities in the northern part of Innlandet county.

For example, the regional health authorities and the Norwegian Public Roads Administration uses the term to describe Trøndelag and all of Møre og Romsdal counties while NVE, Norwegian Water Resources and Energy Directorate, uses it to describe all of Trøndelag, Møre (consisting of Sunnmøre and Nordmøre), and the Helgeland part of Nordland.

Statsbygg, Norwegian Directorate of Public Construction and Property, uses it to describe all of Trøndelag and Møre og Romsdal, Nordland south of Bodø as well as the northern parts of Innlandet county.

The regional newspaper Adresseavisen defines Midt-Norge as Trøndelag, Nordmøre, and some municipalities in the northern part of Innlandet county. This also corresponds to the area covered by the newspaper.

The most used definition is that it covers all of Trøndelag and Møre og Romsdal counties and compared with the traditional regions of Norway it therefore covers all of Trøndelag and some of Vestlandet regions. By this definition it has a total population of just under 760,000 people, with the Trondheim metropolitan region accounting for roughly 275,000.

There has been some political movement towards replacing the counties with larger regions. It is then expected that much of Central Norway, at least Trøndelag and Nordmøre, will form one such region due to the historical, cultural and linguistic ties.

References

Sources 
Statistics Norway
Adresseavisen: Vil ha færre og større regioner, 22 April 2007 
NRK Nyheter: Foreslår ni regioner, 2 July 2006

External links 
Central Norway Regional Health Authority
Norwegian Public Roads Administration

Geography of Norway
Subdivisions of Norway
Regions of Norway